Television in El Salvador consists of both local channels and foreign television, normally distributed through cable.

History
The first attempts to create television were made by the Mexican Rubén González on his own initiative in April 1956. In the same month, Boris Eserski, Guillermo Pinto and Tono Alfaro, former owners of the YSEB radio, collaborated in this creation. The first television channel launched was YSLA-TV, now known as Canal 6. By 6 April 1973, the first TV channel in color was launched on Canal 6 as a first air date .

El Salvador had initially adopted ATSC Standards for digital terrestrial television broadcasting, but later decided to adopt the ISDB-T International standard used in many other Latin American nations. The first Digital TV Channel is TVES on 21 December 2018, serving three channels in one.

Salvadoran TV channels

In El Salvador, there are many religious television shows and many telenovelas. El Salvador is served by three national television corporations (TCS, RSM and Megavisión), one state-run channel (C10) and many minor channels.

References